Thomas Reynold may refer to:

 Thomas Reynolds (bishop) or Reynold
Thomas Reynold (MP) for Leominster

See also
Thomas Reynolds (disambiguation)